"Mou 'His Perasi" (Greek: Μου 'Χεις Περάσει) is a song by Greek singer Despina Vandi as a single from her upcoming album. Written by Gavrilis Mosas and produced by Phoebus, the song was released via digital download and on radio stations on November 24, 2011, in Greece and Cyprus, in the hours following its debut on the DC Club.

Background
The song title was first announced on November 17, 2011, with a teaser video from Spicy Music's YouTube Channel. Four days later, on November 21, 2011, a second teaser video was uploaded with some lyrics of the song and the release date. On November 23, 2011, Vandi, in cooperation with the radio station Rithmos 949, presented her new song in the club-restaurant DC (Dream City), at a party for listeners of the station. The single was released to Greek radio on November 24, 2011, first from the radio station Rithmos 949 and uploaded onto YouTube by Spicy Music. The song was released as a digital download on December 13, 2011.

Music video
Vandi was seen filming the music video for "Mou 'His Perasi" in Agrinio, on December 1, 2011. On December 1, Vandi posted on her Twitter account: "Difficult to wake up at 6 00 to prepare for a shooting! When specifically have slept at 3 00!" and added "Mou his perasi... Now! http://twitpic.com/7mirmi". The same day, the image maker Alexandra Katsaiti and the hair and make-up artist Dimitris Giannetos, uploaded onto Twitter some photos from backstage.

Track listing
"Mou 'cheis Perasei (Single Version)" (Μου 'Χεις Περάσει) – 4:22

Release history

Credits and personnel

Personnel
Gavrilis Mosas - music
Phoebus - lyrics
Despina Vandi - vocals

Production
Phoebus - production, orchestration

Charts

References

2011 singles
Despina Vandi songs
Songs written by Phoebus (songwriter)